The Mountain Bike Hall of Fame (MBHOF) was founded in 1988 to chronicle the history of mountain biking. Formerly located in Crested Butte, Colorado, it relocated to Fairfax, California in 2014 and became part of the Marin Museum of Bicycling.

Since the creation of this sport in the 1970s, mountain biking has grown to be immensely popular worldwide and the MBHOF works to document individuals and events which have significantly contributed to mountain biking history. The museum houses items of memorabilia, vintage bikes and components, classic photos, press clippings, and highlights from historic races and events. As of 2016, the MBHOF has inducted more than 140 individuals and groups who have made major contributions to mountain biking.

Inductees

See also
Mountain biking
 History of the mountain bike and mountain biking
 Hall of fame
 United States Bicycling Hall of Fame
 List of bicycle and human powered vehicle museums

References

External links
The Mountain Bike Hall of Fame website

Mountain biking
Mountain bike
Cycling museums and halls of fame
Halls of fame in California
Sports museums in California
Museums in Marin County, California
Awards established in 1988
Cycling awards